Gage Park is a large community park and civic gardens located in Hamilton, Ontario, Canada. It is located at the intersection of Main Street and Gage Avenue in East Hamilton.

Gage Park is the usual site of gay pride in this part of the city. The park hosts the annual Festival of Friends event in the first week of August. The park is also the site of the Hamilton Children's Museum.

The park includes a bandshell, fountain, and a greenhouse constructed in late 2020. 

It is in the top three parks in Hamilton, in terms of urban parkland. The park is most famous for hosting "Movie In The Park" nights.

Festival history 
Besides gay pride, Gage Park was once the home of the Festival of Friends. Previous artists to have played here include:
 Fozzy, the Chris Jericho-fronted touring Rock and Roll act. Jericho is the highest selling and widest-reaching artist to have played the park.
 The Spoons, a highly popular band from Burlington, Ontario, Canada.

References

Municipal parks in Ontario
Parks in Hamilton, Ontario